Toms Elvis Leimanis (born August 7, 1994) is a Latvian professional basketball player. He also serves as a member of the Latvian national basketball team.

Professional career
Leimanis started his career with Ventspils, with which he made his first professional career in the Baltic League. During his first two seasons, his playing time was not big, but he managed to win with Ventspils the Baltic League in 2013 and the Latvian League in 2014.

The following two years, he played with Liepājas Lauvas. At his second year, in 62 matches at the Latvian and Baltic League, he averaged 8.4 points and 3.9 assists in 23.2 minutes per game. In the 2016-17 season, he returned to Ventspils, making his debut also in the Basketball Champions League. Overall in 41 games in the year in all competitions, Leimanis averaged 4.4 points and 1.3 assists in 12 minutes per game.

At the start of the 2017-18 season, he joined Liepājas Lauvas for a second stint. After making really good appearances with the team, he finished the season with Valga-Valka of the Latvian–Estonian Basketball League.

On July 17, 2018, he joined Koroivos of the Greek 2nd Division.

On July 4, 2019, he joined Ciudad de Valladolid of the LEB Oro (Spanish 2nd Division). On July 14, 2020, Leimanis signed with Tsmoki-Minsk of the VTB United League.

In August 2022, he joined CB Estudiantes.

Latvian National Team
Leimanis has played for Latvian U16, U18 and U20 National Team as well as Senior National Team. In July 2013, Leimanis was part of Latvia's historic run at U20 European Championship in Tallinn, Estonia, which was highlighted by making the finals.

Honors and awards

Club career
 Baltic League: (2013)
 Latvian League: (2014)

National Team
 FIBA Europe U-20 Championship Runner Up: (2013)

References

External links
 Player profile from FIBA Europe website
 Player profile from Eurobasket.com website

1994 births
BC Tsmoki-Minsk players
BC Valga players
BK Ventspils players
Guards (basketball)
Koroivos B.C. players
CB Estudiantes players
Latvian expatriate basketball people in Estonia
Latvian men's basketball players
Living people
People from Ventspils